Ibrahim Aliyu (born 16 January 2002) is a Nigerian professional footballer who plays as a winger for Croatian club Lokomotiva.

Club career
Ibrahim joined Lokomotiva's youth team at age 18. On 2 October 2020, Aliyu made his debut with Lokomotiva's senior team against Istra 1961 in a Prva HNL match, coming in as a substitute in the 72nd minute for Reuben Acquah. On 5 March 2023, Aliyu scored a brace against Croatian powerhouse Hajduk Split in a 4-3 victory.

Personal Life
Aliyu has stated that is favorite football club is Real Madrid and that Kylian Mbappé is a player he looks to as a role model.

References

2002 births
Living people
Nigerian footballers
Nigerian expatriate footballers
Nigerian expatriates in Croatia
Expatriate footballers in Croatia
Croatian Football League players